James Stewart ( – 27 April 1768) was a Scottish soldier and politician.

He was the second son of James Stewart, 5th Earl of Galloway and his wife Lady Catherine Montgomerie, daughter of Alexander Montgomerie, 9th Earl of Eglinton.

He was educated at Eton, and served as an officer in the Scots Guards for over 30 years, becoming a Lieutenant-General in 1758.

He was a member of parliament (MP) in the Parliament of Great Britain for 27 years, representing Wigtown Burghs 1734–41 and 1747–54 and 
Wigtownshire 1741–47 and 1754–61.

His younger brother William was also an MP for Wigtown Burghs.

References

Sources 
 Edith, Lady Haden-Guest, STEWART, Hon. James (c.1699-1768), of Auchleand, Wigtown. in The History of Parliament: the House of Commons 1754-1790 (1964).
 R. S. Lea, STEWART, Hon. James (c.1699-1768), of Auchleand, Wigtown. in The History of Parliament: the House of Commons 1715-1754 (1970).

1699 births
1768 deaths
Younger sons of earls
People educated at Eton College
British Army generals
Scots Guards officers
37th Regiment of Foot officers
British Army personnel of the War of the Austrian Succession
Members of the Parliament of Great Britain for Scottish constituencies
British MPs 1734–1741
British MPs 1741–1747
British MPs 1747–1754
British MPs 1754–1761